Baculoviral IAP repeat-containing protein3 (also known as cIAP2) is a protein that in humans is encoded by the BIRC3 gene.

cIAP2 is a member of the inhibitor of apoptosis family that inhibit apoptosis by interfering with the activation of caspases.  The encoded protein inhibits apoptosis induced by serum deprivation but does not affect apoptosis resulting from exposure to menadione, a potent inducer of free radicals. The cIAP2 protein contains three BIR domains, a UBA domain, a CARD domain and a RING finger domain. Transcript variants encoding the same isoform have been identified.

Interactions
Baculoviral IAP repeat-containing protein 3 has been shown to interact with:
 CASP9, 
 RIPK1, 
 TRAF1, 
 TRAF2,  and
 UBE2D2.

References

Further reading

External links
 
 

Oncogenes